Metacyrba is a genus of jumping spiders that was first described by Frederick Octavius Pickard-Cambridge in 1901. The name is combined from Ancient Greek  "after, beside" and the salticid genus Cyrba.

Species
 it contains seven species and one subspecies, found in South America, Mexico, the United States, Cuba, and on the Greater Antilles:
Metacyrba alberti Cala-Riquelme, 2017 – Cuba
Metacyrba floridana Gertsch, 1934 – USA
Metacyrba insularis (Banks, 1902) – Ecuador (Galapagos Is.)
Metacyrba pictipes Banks, 1903 – Hispaniola
Metacyrba punctata (Peckham & Peckham, 1894) – USA to Ecuador
Metacyrba taeniola (Hentz, 1846) (type) – USA, Mexico
Metacyrba t. similis Banks, 1904 – USA, Mexico
Metacyrba venusta (Chickering, 1946) – Mexico to Venezuela

References

External links
 Painting of M. punctata
 Painting of M. taeniola

Salticidae genera
Salticidae
Spiders of North America
Spiders of South America
Taxa named by Frederick Octavius Pickard-Cambridge